Gressoney was a commune of Aosta Valley in north-west Italy. It was created in 1928 by the union of the two existing communes of Gressoney-La-Trinité and Gressoney-Saint-Jean. From 1939 onwards its official name was Italianized as Gressonei. The commune was suppressed in 1946 when the two former communes were reconstituted.

References
This article was originally translated from this version of :it:Gressoney, its counterpart in the Italian Wikipedia.

Former municipalities of Aosta Valley